Chlamyphoridae is a family of cingulate mammals. While glyptodonts have traditionally been considered stem-group cingulates outside the group that contains modern armadillos, there had been speculation that the extant family Dasypodidae could be paraphyletic based on morphological evidence. In 2016, an analysis of Doedicurus mtDNA found it was, in fact, nested within the modern armadillos as the sister group of a clade consisting of Chlamyphorinae and Tolypeutinae. For this reason, all extant armadillos but Dasypus were relocated to a new family.



Classification

Below is a taxonomy of the extant species of armadillos in this family.

Family Chlamyphoridae
 Subfamily Chlamyphorinae
 Genus Calyptophractus
 Greater fairy armadillo, Calyptophractus retusus
 Genus Chlamyphorus
Pink fairy armadillo, Chlamyphorus truncatus
 Subfamily Euphractinae
 Genus Euphractus
Six-banded armadillo, Euphractus sexcinctus
 Genus Zaedyus
Pichi, Zaedyus pichiy
 Genus Chaetophractus
Screaming hairy armadillo, Chaetophractus vellerosus
Big hairy armadillo, Chaetophractus villosus
Andean hairy armadillo, Chaetophractus nationi
 Subfamily Tolypeutinae
 Genus Cabassous
Greater naked-tailed armadillo, Cabassous tatouay
Chacoan naked-tailed armadillo, Cabassous chacoensis
Northern naked-tailed armadillo, Cabassous centralis
Southern naked-tailed armadillo, Cabassous unicinctus
 Genus Priodontes
Giant armadillo, Priodontes maximus
 Genus Tolypeutes
Southern three-banded armadillo, Tolypeutes matacus
Brazilian three-banded armadillo, Tolypeutes tricinctus

Phylogeny
Chlamyphoridae, like Dasypodidae, is a basal clade within Cingulata, as shown below.

References

Cingulates
Xenarthrans
Mammal families